Infertility in polycystic ovary disease (PCOS) is a hormonal imbalance in women that is thought to be one of the leading causes of female infertility. Polycystic ovary syndrome causes more than 75% of cases of anovulatory infertility.

Pathophysiology
Not all women with PCOS have difficulty becoming pregnant. For those who do, anovulation is a common cause. The mechanism of this anovulation is uncertain, but there is evidence of arrested antral follicle development, which, in turn, may be caused by abnormal interaction of insulin and luteinizing hormone (LH) on granulosa cells.

Endocrine disruption may also directly decrease fertility, such as changed levels of gonadotropin-releasing hormone, gonadotropins (especially an increase in luteinizing hormone), hyperandrogenemia, and hyperinsulinemia. Gonadotropins are released by gonadotroph cells in pituitary gland, and these cells appear to harbor insulin receptors, which are affected by elevated insulin levels. A reason that insulin sensitizers work in increasing fertility is that they lower total insulin levels in body as metabolic tissues regain sensitivity to the hormone. This reduces the overstimulation of gonadotroph cells in pituitary.

Diagnosis
PCOS usually causes infertility associated with anovulation, and therefore, the presence of ovulation indicates absence of infertility, though it does not rule out infertility by other causes.

Ovulation prediction
Ovulation may be predicted by the use of urine tests that detect the preovulatory LH surge, called ovulation predictor kits (OPKs). However, OPKs are not always accurate when testing on women with PCOS.  Charting of cervical mucus may also be used to predict ovulation, or certain fertility monitors (those that track urinary hormones or changes in saliva) may be used.  Methods that predict ovulation may be used to time intercourse or insemination appropriately. Women with PCOS often ovulate at any time during their cycle, to best increase chances of conceiving it is best to have intercourse at least every other day during the 2nd and 3rd week after their period ends.

Ovulation may also be confirmed by testing for serum progesterone in mid-luteal phase, approximately seven days after ovulation (if ovulation occurred on the average cycle day of fourteen, seven days later would be cycle day 21).  A mid-luteal phase progesterone test may also be used to diagnose luteal phase defect.  Methods that confirm ovulation may be used to evaluate the effectiveness of treatments to stimulate ovulation.

Basal body temperatures are not reliable for predicting ovulation.

Management
Management of infertility in polycystic ovary syndrome includes lifestyle modification as well as assisted reproductive technology such as ovulation induction, oocyte release triggering and surgery.

Lifestyle modification
For overweight women with PCOS who are anovulatory, diet adjustments and weight loss are associated with resumption of spontaneous ovulation. Preliminary evidence suggests that exercise may improve menstrual regularity, pregnancy and ovulation rates, but more research is needed.

Ovulation induction
For those who after weight loss still are anovulatory or for anovulatory lean women, ovulation induction to reverse the anovulation is the principal treatment used to help infertility in PCOS. Letrozole and Clomiphene citrate are the first-line treatment in subfertile anovulatory patients with PCOS. A Cochrane review showed that letrozole (an aromatase inhibitor) appears to improve live birth and pregnancy rates as compared to clomiphene citrate. There appeared to be no difference between letrozole and laparoscopic ovarian drilling. Gonadotrophins such as follicle-stimulating hormone (FSH) are, in addition to surgery, second-line treatments.

In vitro fertilization
For patients who do not respond to diet, lifestyle modification and ovulation induction, in vitro fertilisation can be performed. This usually includes controlled ovarian hyperstimulation with FSH injections, and oocyte release triggering with human chorionic gonadotropin (hCG) or a GnRH agonist.

Surgery
Surgery can be attempted in case of inefficient result with medications for ovulation induction. Though surgery is not commonly performed, the polycystic ovaries can be treated with a laparoscopic procedure called "ovarian drilling" (puncture of 4-10 small follicles with electrocautery), which often results in either resumption of spontaneous ovulations or ovulations after adjuvant treatment with clomiphene or FSH.

Inefficacy of metformin
Previously, metformin was recommended treatment for anovulation.

A systematic review and meta-analysis in 2012 concluded that there is insufficient evidence to establish a difference between metformin and clomiphene citrate in terms of ovulation, pregnancy, live birth, miscarriage, and multiple pregnancy rates in women with PCOS and a BMI less than 32 kg/m2. It emphasized that a lack of superiority of one treatment is not evidence for equivalence.

Another review in 2012 concluded that metformin improves pregnancy rates in women with PCOS when compared with placebo, and in addition to clomiphene compared with clomiphene alone, but not when compared directly with clomiphene. Also, however, it concluded that metformin does not improve live birth rates, whether used alone or in combination with clomiphene. It therefore concluded that the benefit of metformin in the improvement of reproductive outcomes in women with PCOS is limited.

The ESHRE/ASRM-sponsored Consensus workshop does not recommend metformin for ovulation stimulation. Subsequent randomized studies have confirmed the lack of evidence for adding metformin to clomiphene.

When taken prior to or during IVF, there is no evidence that metformin treatment improves live birth rate in women with PCOS. However, metformin was found to increase clinical pregnancy rates and reduce the risk of ovarian hyperstimulation syndrome (OHSS) in women with PCOS and undergoing IVF cycles.

Prognosis
PCOS increases the time to pregnancy but does not necessarily reduce eventual family size. It does not appear to increase miscarriage frequency.

References

Endocrine gonad disorders
Gynaecology
Medical conditions related to obesity
Syndromes
Infertility
Endocrine-related cutaneous conditions